763 Naval Air Squadron (763 NAS) was a Naval Air Squadron of the Royal Navy's Fleet Air Arm. It formed in 1939 as the Torpedo Spotter Reconnaissance Pool No. 1, at RNAS Worthy Down. Three months later, it moved to the short-lived RNAS Jersey, before moving back to Worthy Down via RNAS Lee-on Solent and disbanding in 1940. The squadron reformed, on the seaplane carrier HMS Pegasus, as a Seaplane Training Squadron, in 1942. This role lasted around two years and the squadron continually operated and provided training from HMS Pegasus, until disbanding in 1944. Roughly two months later, the squadron reformed again, this time at RNAS Inskip, as an Anti-submarine Operational Training Squadron and remained in this role for just over one year, disbanding in July 1945 at Inskip.

History of 763 NAS

Torpedo Spotter Reconnaissance Pool No. 1 (1939 - 1940) 

It was initially equipped with six Swordfish I aircraft.

The squadron moved to RNAS Jersey on the 11 March 1940 taking its six Swordfish along with six Albacore aircraft. In early March the Admiralty had taken over Jersey airport, located at St Peter, Jersey, Channel Islands, to use as a Naval air station. However, due to the German occupation of France and the proximity to the Channel Islands, the Government concluded the Islands weren't defendable and 763 NAS relocated to RNAS Lee-on-Solent (HMS Daedalus), situated near Lee-on-the-Solent in Hampshire, on the 31 May 1940.

The squadron remained at Lee-on-Solent for around one month before moving back to Worthy Down on the 4 July 1940. Four days later, on the 8th July 1940, 763 NAS disbanded at Worthy Down.

Seaplane Training Squadron (1942 - 1944) 

763 Naval Air Squadron reformed on the 20 April 1942, as a Seaplane Training Squadron, aboard HMS Pegasus, which was designed and built as a seaplane carrier. It was equipped with Walrus aircraft and the squadron provided catapult and recovery training. It remained in the role and on the carrier for nearly two years. The squadron disbanded on HMS Pegasus on the 13 February 1944.

Anti-submarine Operational Training Squadron (1944 - 1945) 
763 Naval Air Squadron reformed on the 14 April 1944, at RNAS Inskip (HMS Nightjar), located near the village of Inskip, Lancashire, England, as an Anti-submarine Operational Training Squadron. It was equipped with Avenger aircraft.

In March 1945 the squadron also received Swordfish aircraft and a small Photographic Flight was set up. However, on the 31 July 1945, 763 NAS disbanded at Inskip.

Aircraft flown

The squadron has flown a number of different aircraft types, including:
Fairey Swordfish I (Dec 1939 - Jul 1940)
Fairey Albacore I (Mar 1940 - Jul 1940)
Supermarine Walrus I (Apr 1942 - Feb 1944)
Vought Kingfisher I (Jul 1943 - Sep 1943)
Grumman Tarpon GR.I (Apr 1944 - Jul 1945)
Grumman Avenger Mk.II (Apr 1944 - Jul 1945)
Avro Anson Mk I (May 1944 - Aug 1945)
Fairey Swordfish II (Mar 1945 - Jul 1945)

Naval Air Stations /  Seaplane Carrier 

766 Naval Air Squadron operated from a number of naval air stations of the Royal Navy, and a seaplane carrier:
Royal Naval Air Station WORTHY DOWN (15 December 1939 - 11 March 1940)
Royal Naval Air Station JERSEY (11 March 1940 - 31 May 1940)
Royal Naval Air Station LEE-ON-SOLENT (31 May 1940 - 4 July 1940)
Royal Naval Air Station WORTHY DOWN (4 July 1940 - 8 July 1940)
HMS Pegasus (20 April 1942 - 13 February 1944)
Royal Naval Air Station INSKIP (Apr 1944 - Jul 1945)

Commanding Officers 

List of commanding officers of 763 Naval Air Squadron with month and year of appointment and end:
Lt-Cdr P. L. Mortimer, RN (Dec 1939-Jul 1940)
Lt J. R. W. Groves, RN (Apr 1942-May 1943)
Lt S. M. Howard, RN (May 1943-Feb 1944)
Lt-Cdr C. R. Mallett, RNVR (Apr 1944-Jul 1944)
Lt-Cdr R. J. G. Brown, RNVR (Jul 1944-Dec 1944)
Lt-Cdr N. G. Haigh, RNVR (Dec 1944-Jul 1945)

References

Citations

Bibliography

 

700 series Fleet Air Arm squadrons
Military units and formations established in 1939
Military units and formations of the Royal Navy in World War II